Eggville is an unincorporated community in Lee County, Mississippi.

History

Eggville was named for the large amount of eggs produced in the area. A post office operated under the name Eggville from 1889 to 1904.

Eggville was once home to the Northeast Mississippi Sacred Harp Singing Convention.

References

Unincorporated communities in Lee County, Mississippi
Unincorporated communities in Mississippi